Obinna Julius Nwosu (born May 1, 1971), is a Nigerian former professional basketball player. He played briefly for the American National Basketball Association's San Antonio Spurs during the 1994–95 NBA season. He also had a career in the Lebanese Basketball League and the Philippine Basketball Association.

Playing career
Born in Nkwere, Nigeria, Nwosu attended Liberty University in Lynchburg, Virginia.  Nwosu has played in 14 different countries during his 14-year career.

He won the Russian league title in 1996 with CSKA Moscow, and the French league crown in 2001 with Pau-Orthez. Nwosu led the Red Bull Thunder to the PBA Commissioner's Cup title in 2002. In 2005, he started with Asesoft Ploiesti in Romania (averaging 12.8 points and 9.8 rebounds in FIBA Europe Cup), before signing with Syrian club Al Jalaa Aleppo in February 2006. He later played in the Dominican Republic.

He was part of the 1998 FIBA World Championship Nigerian national team that played at the FIBA World Championship. But due to bad medication bought at a market in Lagos, he was suspended for doping and could not finish the tournament.

NBA career statistics

Regular season 

|-
| align="left" | 1994–95
| align="left" | San Antonio
| 23 || 0 || 3.7 || .321 || .000 || .765 || 1.0 || .1 || .0 || .1 || 1.3
|- class="sortbottom"
| style="text-align:center;" colspan="2"| Career
| 23 || 0 || 3.7 || .321 || .000 || .765 || 1.0 || .1 || .0 || .1 || 1.3

Playoffs 

|-
| align="left" | 1994–95
| align="left" | San Antonio
| 2 || 0 || 3.5 || .000 || .000 || .000 || 1.0 || .0 || .0 || .0 || 0.0
|- class="sortbottom"
| style="text-align:center;" colspan="2"| Career
| 2 || 0 || 3.5 || .000 || .000 || .000 || 1.0 || .0 || .0 || .0 || 0.0

Notes

External links
Basketball-Reference.com: Julius Nwosu
NBA stats @ basketballreference.com
Player profile 
ACB.com Profile 

1971 births
Living people
1998 FIBA World Championship players
2006 FIBA World Championship players
Akita Isuzu/Isuzu Motors Lynx/Giga Cats players
Barako Bull Energy Boosters players
BC Avtodor Saratov players
Centers (basketball)
Connecticut Pride players
Galatasaray S.K. (men's basketball) players
Greek Basket League players
Liberty Flames basketball players
Liga ACB players
National Basketball Association players from Nigeria
Nigerian expatriate basketball people in the United States
Panathinaikos B.C. players
PBC CSKA Moscow players
Philippine Basketball Association imports
Power forwards (basketball)
San Antonio Spurs players
Undrafted National Basketball Association players
Nigerian expatriate basketball people in the Philippines
Magnolia Hotshots players
Al Riyadi Club Beirut basketball players